Henry More  (12 October 1614 – 1 September 1687) was an English philosopher of the Cambridge Platonist school.

Biography
Henry was born in Grantham, Lincolnshire on 12 October 1614. He was the seventh son of Alexander More, mayor of Grantham, and Anne More (née Lacy). Both his parents were Calvinists but he himself "could never swallow that hard doctrine."

He was schooled at The King's School, Grantham and at Eton College. In 1631 he entered Christ's College, Cambridge, at about the time John Milton was leaving it. He took his BA in 1635, his MA in 1639, and immediately afterwards became a fellow of his college, turning down all other positions that were offered. He would not accept the mastership of his college, to which, it is understood, he would have been preferred in 1654, when Ralph Cudworth was appointed.  In 1675, he finally accepted a prebend in Gloucester Cathedral, but only to resign it in favour of his friend Edward Fowler, afterwards bishop of Gloucester.

More taught many notable pupils, including Anne Finch, sister of Heneage Finch, subsequently Earl of Nottingham. She later became Lady Conway, and at her country seat at Ragley in Warwickshire, More would spend "a considerable part of his time." She and her husband both appreciated him, and amidst the woods of this retreat he wrote several of his books. The spiritual enthusiasm of Lady Conway was a considerable factor in some of More's speculations, even though she at length joined the Quakers. She became the friend not only of More and William Penn, but of Franciscus Mercurius van Helmont (1614–1699) and Valentine Greatrakes, mystical thaumaturgists of the 17th-century. Ragley became a centre of devotion and spiritualism.

Views
More was a rationalist theologian. He attempted to use the details of 17th-century mechanical philosophy—as developed by René Descartes—to establish the existence of immaterial substance.

More rejected Cartesian dualism on the following grounds: "It would be easier for me to attribute matter and extension to the soul, than to attribute to an immaterial thing the capacity to move and be moved by the body.' His difficulties with Cartesian dualism arose, not from an inability to understand how material and immaterial substances could interact, but from an unwillingness to accept any unextended entity as any kind of real entity.  More continues "...it is plain that if a thing  be at all it must be extended." So for More 'spirit' too must be extended. This led him to the idea of a 'fourth dimension' (a term which he coined) in which the spirit is extended (to which he gave the curious name of "essential spissitude") and to an original solution to the mind-body problem.

Influence
More appears to be the origin of the still-popular slur against medieval Scholasticism that it engaged in useless speculative debates, such as how many angels might dance on the head of a pin (or "on a needles [sic] point," as he puts it), in the second chapter of The Immortality of the Soul.

A quotation from More is used as the epigraph of Ralph Waldo Emerson's  essay "The Over-soul".

Helena Blavatsky, the founder of Theosophy, quoted More and gave an exposition of his ideas in chapter VII of "Isis Unveiled".

Works

More was a prolific writer of verse and prose. The Divine Dialogues (1688) condenses his general view of philosophy and religion. Like many others, he began as a poet and ended as a prose writer. His first work, published in 1642, but written two years earlier, was Psychodoia Platonica: or, a Platonicall Song of the Soul, consisting of four several Poems. It was followed in 1647 by his full collection of Philosophical Poems, which includes The Song of the Soul, enlarged and is dedicated to his father. A second edition was published in the same year, and it was included by A. B. Grosart in his Chertsey Worthies Library (1878).

More's prose works are:

Observations upon Anthroposophic Theomagica and Anima Magica Abscondita, by Alazonomastix Philalethes (pseudonym, see -mastix), 1650; in answer to Thomas Vaughan, who replied in The Man-mouse took in a Trape.
 The Second Lash of Alazonomastix, a rejoinder to Vaughan, 1651.
An Antidote against Atheism, or an Appeal to the Natural Faculties of the Minde of Man, whether there be not a God, 1653: 2nd edit. corrected and enlarged, with an Appendix, 1655.
conjecture Cabbalistica ... or a Conjectural Essay of Interpreting the Minde of Moses, according to a Threefold Cabbala: viz. Literal, Philosophical, Mystical, or Divinely Moral, 1653; dedicated to Ralph Cudworth.
 enthusiasm Triumphatus, or a Discourse of Nature, Causes, Kinds, and Cure of Enthusiasm; written by Philophilus Parrasiastes, and prefixed to Alazonomastix his Observations and Reply, 1656.
 The Immortality of the Soul, so far forth as it is demonstrable from the Knowledge of Nature and the Light of Reason, 1659; dedicated to Viscount Conway.
An Explanation of the Grand Mystery of Godliness; or a True and Faithful Representation of the Everlasting Gospel of our Lord and Saviour Jesus Christ, 1660.
 A Modest Enquiry into the Mystery of Iniquity, and an Apologie, 1664.
Enchiridion Ethicum, praecipua Moralis Philosophiae Rudimenta complectens, illustrate ut plurimum Veterum Monuments, et ad Probitatem Vitae perpetuo accommodate, 1667, 1668, 1669, 1695, 1696, and 1711.
Divine Dialogues, containing sundry Disquisitions and Instructions concerning the Attributes of God and His Providence in the World, 1668. The most authentic edition appeared in 1713.
An Exposition of the Seven Epistles to the Seven Churches; Together with a Brief Discourse of Idolatry, with application to the Church of Rome. The title of the latter in the volume itself is An Antidote against Idolatry, and it elicited from More in reply to attacks A brief Reply to a late Answer to Dr. Henry More his antidote against Idolatry, 1672, and An Appendix to the late Antidote against Idolatry, 1673.
Enchiridion Metaphysicum: sive, de rebus incorporeis succincta et luculenta dissertatio; pars prima, 1671, an attack on Cartesian philosophy, which he had in earlier life admired.
Remarks upon two late ingenious Discourses [by Matthew Hale]; the one, an Essay, touching the Gravitation and non-Gravitation of Fluid Bodies; the other, touching the Torricellian Experiment, so far forth as they may concern any passages in his "Enchiridion Metaphysicum," 1676.
Apocalypsis Apocalypseos; or the Revelation of St. John the Divine unveiled: an exposition from chapter to chapter and from verse to verse of the whole Book of the Apocalypse, 1680.
A Plain and continued Exposition of the several Prophecies or Divine Visions of the Prophet Daniel, which have or may concern the People of God, whether Jew or Christian, 1681.
A Brief Discourse of the Real Presence of the Body and Blood of Christ in the Celebration of the Holy Eucharist; wherein the Witty Artifices of the Bishop of Meaux [Bossuet] and of Monsieur Maimbourg are obviated, whereby they would draw in the Protestants to imbrace the doctrine of Transubstantiation, 1681.

More is also believed to have written Philosophiae Teutonicae Censura, 1670, a criticism of the theosophy of Jacob Boehme; and to have edited Joseph Glanvill's Saducismus Triumphatus, 1681. He certainly contributed largely to the volume, and also wrote many of the annotations to Glanvill's Lux Orientalis, 1682. More agreed with Glanvill on belief in witchcraft and apparitions. Several letters from More to John Worthington are printed in Worthington's Diary, and some Letters Philosophical and Moral between John Norris and Henry More are added to Norris's Theory and Regulation of Love, 1688. A Collection of several Philosophical Writings of Dr. Henry More was first published in 1662 and includes his Antidote against Atheism, with the Appendix, Enthusiasmus Triumphatus, Letters to Des Cartes, &c., Immortality of the Soul, and Conjectura Cabbalistica. A fourth edition, corrected and much enlarged, was published in 1712, with notes.'

More issued complete editions of his works, his Opera theologica in 1675, and his Opera philosophica in 1678. Between 1672 and 1675 he was principally engaged in translating his English works into Latin. In 1675 appeared Henrici Mori Cantabrigiensis Opera Theologica, Anglice quidem primitius scripta, mine vero per autorem Latine reddita. Hisce novus praefixus est De Synchronismis Apocalypticis Tractatulus. It was followed in 1679 by a larger work in two volumes, Henrici Mori Cantabrigiensis Opera Omnia, tum quae Latine tum quae Anglice scripta sunt; nunc vero Latinitate donata instigatu et impensis generosissimi juvenis Johannis Cockshutt nobilis Angli. John Cockshutt of the Inner Temple had left a legacy of £300 to More to have three of his principal pieces translated into Latin; and More complied with the terms of the legacy by translating into Latin many more of his English works. In 1692 were published Discourses on Several Texts of Scripture, with a preface signed "John Worthington"; and in 1694 Letters on Several Subjects, published by Edmund Elys. Abridgments of and extracts from the works of More were numerous; and in 1708 a volume was published for charitable libraries, The Theological Works of the most Pious and Learned Henry More. The work is in English, but "according to the author's Improvements in his Latin edition".

The main authorities for More's life are Richard Ward's Life (1710); the prefatio generalissima prefixed to his Opera omnia (1679); and also an account of his writings in an Apology published in 1664. His Philosophical Poems appeared  (1647), with his Echief speculations and experiences". Analysis of his life and works is given in John Tulloch's Rational Theology, vol. ii. (1874); see also Johann Georg Ritter von Zimmermann, Henry More und die vierte Dimension des Raums (Vienna, 1881); Henry More: Tercentenary Studies, ed. by Sarah Hutton (Dordrecht, 1990).

Notes

References

 Aharon Lichtenstein, Henry More: The Rational Theology of a Cambridge Platonist Cambridge: Harvard University Press, 1962.
 S. Hutton (ed.) Henry More (1614–1687): Tercentenary Studies Dordrecht:  Kluwer Academic  Publishers, 1990. 
 D. Hedley and S. Hutton (ed.) Platonism at the Origins of Modernity Dordrecht: Springer, 2008.
 Ryan Stark, Rhetoric, Science, and Magic in Seventeenth-Century England. Washington, DC: The Catholic University of America Press, 2009, 99–101. 
 Jasper Reid, The Metaphysics of Henry More. Dordrecht: Springer, 2012.

Attribution

External links

 
 
 
 

17th-century English Anglican priests
17th-century English philosophers
Enlightenment philosophers
People from Grantham
Cambridge Platonists
People educated at Eton College
17th-century Christian mystics
1614 births
1687 deaths
Christian Hebraists
Alumni of Christ's College, Cambridge
Fellows of Christ's College, Cambridge
Fellows of the Royal Society
Protestant mystics
People educated at The King's School, Grantham
English male non-fiction writers